The 1999–2000 Copa del Rey was the 98th staging of the Copa del Rey.

The competition started on 1 September 1999 and concluded on 27 May 2000 with the Final, held at the Estadio Mestalla in Valencia.

Preliminary round 

|}

First round 

|}

Second round 

|-
|colspan=5 style="font-size:smaller" | Bye: Real Madrid CF
|}

Round of 16 

|}

Quarter-finals 

|}

Semi-finals 

|}

Note: Barcelona failed to play the second leg due to a fixture clash with UEFA international matches, which left Barcelona with only seven first-team players. The competition rules at the time for the Copa del Rey allowed sides a maximum of three youth players per match, leaving Barcelona with a squad of ten players for the return leg against Atlético de Madrid. The ten Barcelona players refused to take to the field as a protest against the Spanish FA (RFEF), thus forfeiting the match.

Final

Top goalscorers

References

External links 
 www.linguasport.com 

1999-00
1999–2000 in Spanish football cups